Pray for Haiti is a studio album by American rapper Mach-Hommy. It was released on May 21, 2021, through Griselda Records and Daupe! Production was handled by Camoflauge Monk, ConductorWilliams, Denny LaFlare, Cee Gee, DJ Green Lantern, Messiah Muzik, Nicholas Craven and Sadhu Gold, with Westside Gunn and Mach-Hommy serving as executive producers. It features guest appearances from Westside Gunn, Keisha Plum, Melanie Charles and Tha God Fahim.

Mach-Hommy has announced that 20 percent of the album's profits will be donated to the Pray for Haiti Trust Fund, which he set up to fund educational infrastructure in Haiti.

Background 
Mach-Hommy and Westside Gunn, though onetime collaborators, had fallen out of touch throughout much of the later 2010s. However, the pair made up late in 2020 and began to collaborate again. In an interview with Rolling Stone, Westside Gunn states that once the pair had reunited, "[w]e picked up where we left off. And from there, we said 'let's just kill this.'"

Critical reception 
The album was met with universal acclaim from music critics. At Metacritic, which assigns a normalized rating out of 100 to reviews from mainstream publications, the album received an average score of 85 based on eight reviews. The album has received particular praise for Mach-Hommy's lyricism. Paul A. Thompson of Pitchfork described the project as having "razor-sharp bars and an exceptional eye for detail", and gave it a "Best New Music" award. Riley Wallace of HipHopDX gave a similar appraisal, describing the album as "fram[ing] hard-as-nails themes with calmly delivered, tastefully complex wordplay", while Fred Thomas of AllMusic characterized Mach's lyrics as "cutting, hilarious, and multi-dimensional". The production on the album has been described as "varied" but generally "stripped-back".

Track listing

References

External links 
 

2021 albums
Griselda Records albums
Underground hip hop albums
Albums produced by DJ Green Lantern